In the aftermath of the First World War, the Fiume Question, part of the larger Adriatic Question or Adriatic Problem concerned the fate of the territory that was part of the Corpus Separatum of Fiume, the Royal Free City and one of the only two free ports of the Austro-Hungarian empire.
The roots of the problem lay in the ethnically mixed population of the Corpus Separatum in a time of growing nationalism, Italian irredentism and the South-Slavist Illyrian Movement which led ultimately to the creation of the State of Slovenes, Croats and Serbs that was later called Yugoslavia. The question was a major barrier to agreement at the 1919 Paris Peace Conference but was partially resolved by the Treaty of Rapallo between Italy and Yugoslavia on 12 November 1920.

Background
Fiume (or Rijeka in Croatian) was for centuries home to a Slavonic speaking working class and an Italian commercial class. The settlement had very humble dimensions until it was declared a free port (together with the Port of Trieste) in 1719 by Austrian emperor Charles VI, and subsequently annexed to the Kingdom of Hungary by Austrian empress Maria Theresa in 1779 as a Corpus Separatum and Hungary's only international port. This brought a rapid economic and industrial growth, in particular in the time encompassing the second half of the 19th century and up to World War I. In this period Fiume also saw a shift in the ethnic composition of the city. The Kingdom of Hungary, which administered the city during that period, favoured the Hungarian element in the city and encouraged immigration from all lands of the Austro-Hungarian Empire. The city became a melting pot encompassing most of the main ethnicities and cultures in empire, being also a main departure port for emigration to the New World. The mixed ethnic composition would open the doors to the Fiume Question in the years following World War I and the demise of the Habsburg Empire.

At the last Austro-Hungarian census in 1911, the Corpus Separatum had a population of 49,608 people and was composed of the following linguistic communities:

Total population: 49,608:

 Italian: 23,283 (46.9%)
 Croatian: 15,731 (31.7%)
 Slovenian: 3,937 (7.9%)
 Hungarian: 3,619 (7.3%)
 German: 2,476 (5.0%)
 English: 202 (0.4%)
 Czech: 183 (0.3%)
 Serbian: 70 (0.14%)
 French: 40 (0.08%)
 Polish: 36 (0.07%)
 Romanian: 29 (0.06%)

The Peace conference in Paris and the Italo-Yugoslav dispute

Habsburg-ruled Austria-Hungary's disintegration (October 1918) in the closing weeks of World War I led to the establishment of rival Croato-Serbian and Italian administrations in the city; both Italy and the founders of the new Kingdom of the Serbs, Croats and Slovenes (later the Kingdom of Yugoslavia) claimed sovereignty based on their "irredentist" ("unredeemed") ethnic populations.
After a brief military occupation by the Kingdom of Serbs Croats and Slovenes, followed by the unilateral annexation of the former Corpus Separatum by Zagreb and Belgrade, an international force of British, Italian, French and American troops entered the city (November 1918). Its future came under discussion at the Paris Peace Conference during the course of 1919.
Italy based its claim on the fact that Italians comprised the largest single nationality within the city (65% of the total population at the time of the peace conference, according to local Italian sources). Croats made up a good part of the remainder and were also a majority in the surrounding area, including the neighbouring town of Sušak. Andrea Ossoinack, who had been the last delegate from Fiume to the Hungarian Parliament, was admitted to the conference as a representative of Fiume, and essentially supported the Italian claims. Nevertheless, the city had a strong and very active Autonomist Association advocating an independent state, which also had its delegates at the Paris conference and was represented by Ruggero Gotthardi.

See also
Free State of Fiume

References

Further reading
 Reill, Dominique Kirchner. The Fiume Crisis: Life in the Wake of the Habsburg Empire (2020) online review

Free State of Fiume
1919 in international relations
1920 in international relations
Austria-Hungary